Maï Anh Le is a French actress of Vietnamese origin .  She studied economics and management, while supporting herself by working as a model. She began her acting career in 2002 with the role of Akemi in Giodano Gederlini's feature film Samourais. In 2003, she acted with Sandrine Bonnaire in the TV series La Maison des Enfants. She also starred in 2004 Jean-Jacques Annaud film Two Brothers.

Selected filmography
 3 Days to Kill ... Agent Yasmin 
 2013 Win Win ... Secrétaire de Chang
 2011 Une famille formidable (TV Series)... Mai Lin
 2011 Tous en scène ... Mai Lin
 2011 Vive la crise ... Mai Lin
 2010-2011 Affaires étrangères (TV series) ... Tuo Ma / Xang Hue
 2011 Cambodge ... Tuo Ma
 2010 République dominicaine ... Xang Hue
 2009 La taupe 2 (TV movie) ... Cindy Jong
 2008 Duval and Moretti (TV series) 
 2008 La nouvelle coéquipière
 2008 Dead Cell (short) ... the woman
 2008 Écrire pour un chanteur (TV series) ... la femme d'en face
 2008 Chang Juan (2008) ... la femme d'en face
 2008 Modern Love ... Kim
 2007 L'histoire de Richard O. ... la Vietnamienne hystérique
 2006 R.I.S. Police scientifique (TV series) ... Serveuse Shangai club
 2006 Belle de nuit (2006) ... Serveuse Shangai club
 2005 L'empire du tigre (TV movie) ... Sao
 2004 Poids léger ... Su
 2004 Two Brothers ... Naï-Rea
 2004 La légion étrange (short) ... Emma
 2004 Le 10eme jour (short) ... Manon / Phoebe
 2003 La maison des enfants (TV series) ... Maï
 2002 Samourais ... Akemi

References

Year of birth missing (living people)
Living people
Actresses from Paris
French female models
French film actresses
21st-century French actresses
French television actresses
French people of Vietnamese descent
Actresses of Vietnamese descent